Owen Vincent "Owney" Madden (December 18, 1891 – April 24, 1965) was a British-born gangster of Irish ancestry who became a leading underworld figure in New York during Prohibition. Nicknamed "The Killer", he garnered a brutal reputation within street gangs and organized crime. He ran the Cotton Club in Manhattan and was a leading boxing promoter. After increased harassment from law enforcement in New York, Madden moved to Hot Springs, Arkansas, in 1935, where he remained until his death from natural causes in 1965.

Early life
Owen Vincent Madden was born into a working-class family at 25 Somerset Road in Leeds, England, on December 18, 1891, the son of Irish immigrants Francis Madden and Mary Madden (née O'Neil.) After his mother became a widow she emigrated to New York to become a maid, leaving Owen and his sister Mary and brother Martin in a British orphanage. In 1896, Owen's mother saved up enough money to take them out of the orphanage and get them tickets to join her in New York City. 

The young Madden grew up on the streets New York where he learned how to use blackjacks, knuckledusters, bats, pipes, knives, and stilettoes. By the age of 21 years old, Madden had become the leader of a feared New York street gang known as the Gopher Gang. He earned the nickname, "The Killer" for getting away with two brazen murders. On September 6, 1911, he shot dead a gang member of the rival Hudson Dusters in the heart of Dusters' territory around 30th Street. In February 1912, Madden was on a crowded street trolley, arguing with a store clerk named William Henshaw about a woman, and Madden shot Henshaw in the face. Henshaw was not a gang member, and as he was dying, he named Owney Madden as his killer. Despite the police having his name, and there being eyewitnesses to the crime, Madden never went to trial—witnesses in both killings were intimidated, and disappeared.

In 1915, he eventually went to prison for ordering the killing of William “Little Patsy Doyle” Moore, who had been waging a three-year vendetta campaign against Madden and the Gopher Gang.

Prohibition

After serving seven years of a 10-to-20-year sentence for Moore's manslaughter, Madden was released on parole in 1923. The Gopher Gang had broken up, and many members of his own faction were either in Sing Sing or working for bootlegging gangs.

During this time, Madden employed a young friend as a personal driver. The driver, George Raft, later became a film star noted for his authentic portrayals of gangland figures.

The Cotton Club
Madden purchased the Club Deluxe from former heavyweight boxing champion Jack Johnson and reopened it a year later. Nightclub patrons flooded into Harlem from downtown Manhattan to catch performers such as Cab Calloway, Duke Ellington, Louis Armstrong, Lena Horne, Bill "Bojangles" Robinson, and the Nicholas Brothers. 
Madden and his partners, Big Bill and George Jean "Big Frenchy" DeMange, also muscled their way into a piece of the exclusive Stork Club, where the influential gossip columnist Walter Winchell held court and everyone who was anyone wanted to see and be seen. As a celebrity with ownership in more than twenty night clubs, Madden became well-known and glamorized for his Prohibition-era activities. He also gained recognition for his revenge tactics and payoffs of City Hall.

Exile in Hot Springs
In 1932, Madden was involved in the murder of Vincent "Mad Dog" Coll, who had been extorting money from several mobsters, including DeMange and Madden. After being arrested for a parole violation that same year, Madden began facing greater harassment from police and encroachment on his territory by Italian-American Mafia families, until he finally left New York in 1935.

Leaving behind racketeering, Madden settled in Hot Springs, Arkansas, which had become known as a haven for various criminals, with a corrupt city government and police force. He also became involved in local criminal activities, especially illegal gambling. The Southern Club became a popular nightspot for mobsters; Charles "Lucky" Luciano was apprehended there in 1936. Madden became a naturalized U.S. citizen in 1943 and eventually married the daughter of the city postmaster. He lived in Hot Springs until his death in 1965.

References

Sources

Further reading
 Asbury, Herbert. The Gangs Of New York: An Informal History of the Underworld. United Kingdom: Arrow Books 2002. 
 Clark, Neil G. Dock Boss: Eddie McGrath and the West Side Waterfront. New Jersey: Barricade Books, 2017. 
 English, T.J. Paddy Whacked: The Untold Story of the Irish American Gangster. New York: HarperCollins, 2005. 
 Kelly, Robert J. Encyclopedia of Organized Crime in the United States. Westport, Connecticut: Greenwood Press, 2000. 
 Messick, Hank. Lansky. London: Robert Hale & Company, 1973. 
 Sifakis, Carl. The Mafia Encyclopedia. New York: Da Capo Press, 2005. 
 Downey, Patrick. "Gangster City: History of the New York Underworld 1900–1935". New Jersey: Barricade Books, 2004.

External links
 Gophers, Goose Chasers, and the Early Years of Owney Madden by Allen May
 
 Gangland Tours Owney Madden Video 
 Madden's entry at Encyclopedia of Arkansas History and Culture
 

1891 births
1965 deaths
British crime bosses
British gangsters
Criminals from Manhattan
Criminals from Yorkshire
Depression-era gangsters
English emigrants to the United States
English people of Irish descent
Gang members of New York City
Naturalized citizens of the United States
People from Leeds
Prohibition-era gangsters